Kim In-hwa (born October 5, 1969) is a South Korean rhythmic gymnast.

Kim competed for South Korea in the rhythmic gymnastics individual all-around competition at the 1988 Summer Olympics  in Seoul. There she was 31st in the preliminary (qualification) round and did not advance to the final.

References

External links 
 Kim In-hwa at Sports-Reference.com

1969 births
Living people
South Korean rhythmic gymnasts
Gymnasts at the 1988 Summer Olympics
Olympic gymnasts of South Korea